The 2022 Silicon Valley Classic (also known as the Mubadala Silicon Valley Classic for sponsorship reasons) was a professional tennis tournament played on hard courts. It was the 50th edition of the tournament, and part of the WTA Premier tournaments of the 2022 WTA Tour. It took place between 1 and 7 August 2022 in San Jose, California. It was the first women's event on the 2022 US Open Series.

Champions

Singles

  Daria Kasatkina def.  Shelby Rogers, 6–7(2–7), 6–1, 6–2

Doubles

  Xu Yifan /  Yang Zhaoxuan def.  Shuko Aoyama /  Chan Hao-ching, 7–5, 6–0.

Points and prize money

Point distribution

Singles main draw entrants

Seeds

† Rankings are as of 25 July 2022.

Other entrants
The following players received wildcard entry into the singles main draw:
  Katie Boulter
  Ashlyn Krueger

The following players received entry from the qualifying draw:
  Kayla Day
  Elizabeth Mandlik
  Storm Sanders
  Taylor Townsend

The following player received entry as a lucky loser:
  Caroline Dolehide

Withdrawals
 Before the tournament
  Ekaterina Alexandrova → replaced by  Zhang Shuai
  Danielle Collins → replaced by  Naomi Osaka
  Alizé Cornet → replaced by  Zheng Qinwen
  Garbiñe Muguruza → replaced by  Caroline Dolehide

Doubles main draw entrants

Seeds

† Rankings are as of 25 July 2022.

Other entrants
The following pairs received wildcard entry into the doubles main draw :
  Latisha Chan /  Beatriz Haddad Maia
  Ashlyn Krueger /  Elizabeth Mandlik

References

External links
Official website

2022 WTA Tour
Silicon Valley Classic
2022 in American tennis
2022 in sports in California
August 2022 sports events in the United States